Ryszard Bosek (born 12 April 1950) is a Polish former volleyball player and coach, a member of the Poland national team from 1969 to 1986, and a participant in 3 Olympic Games (1972, 1976, 1980). During his career, he won the titles of the 1976 Olympic Champion and the 1974 World Champion.

Personal life
Bosek was born in Kamienna Góra, Poland. In 2008 he had cancer. After removing the salivary glands and nerve shoulder he returned to health. He worked as a volleyball expert for Polsat Sport, and as a manager of a few volleyball players (Bartosz Kurek, Piotr Nowakowski, Jakub Jarosz).

Career

National team
Bosek took part in a few editions of the World Championship: 1970 (5th place), 1974 and 1978 (8th place). In 1974, Poland, including Bosek, won the World Champions title. It was the first title of the World Champions in the history of Polish volleyball.

Among his achievements, he has three silver medals of the European Championship (1975, 1977, 1979). In all three cases, Poland lost to the Soviet Union.

He was a participant in the Olympic Games: Munich 1972, Montreal 1976, Moscow 1980. In 1976, as one of the players of the team led by Hubert Jerzy Wagner, he won a gold medal at the Olympic Games Montreal 1976. Poland won the final match of the tournament against the Soviet Union on 30 July 1976.

Honours

As a player
 CEV European Champions Cup
  1977/1978 – with Płomień Milowice
 National championships
 1976/1977  Polish Championship, with Płomień Milowice
 1978/1979  Polish Championship, with Płomień Milowice

References

External links

 
 
 Player profile at LegaVolley.it 
 Player profile at Volleybox.net

1950 births
Living people
People from Kamienna Góra
Polish men's volleyball players
Polish volleyball coaches
Olympic volleyball players of Poland
Volleyball players at the 1972 Summer Olympics
Volleyball players at the 1976 Summer Olympics
Volleyball players at the 1980 Summer Olympics
Olympic gold medalists for Poland
Olympic medalists in volleyball
Medalists at the 1976 Summer Olympics
Recipients of the Gold Cross of Merit (Poland)
Polish expatriate sportspeople in Italy
Expatriate volleyball players in Italy
Jastrzębski Węgiel coaches